Maria da Conceição Infante de Lacerda Pereira de Eça Custance O'Neill (Lisbon, 19 November 1873 – 23 March 1932) was a Portuguese writer, poet, journalist, and spiritualist of Irish descent.

Family
Maria O'Neill was the daughter of Carlos Tomás O'Neill (Lisbon, Encarnação, 6 December 1846 – ?) and wife (m. 1873) Maria Carlota Pereira de Eça Infante de Lacerda (Lisbon, 15 July 1852 – Lisbon, 1921), daughter of José António Pereira de Eça and wife Maria da Conceição Infante de Lacerda, and paternal granddaughter of Carlos Torlades O'Neill (30 April 1820 (Baptized Lisbon, São Paulo, 13 May 1822) – ?) and wife (m. Lisbon, Encarnação, 4 November 1845) Adelaide Carolina Custance (Lisbon, Santiago, 15 September 1821 – ?), daughter of Thomas Parsons Custance, an English subject (married secondly to his aunt Ludovina Cecília O'Neill), and first wife Antónia Eugénia Barbosa de Brito.

She had a younger brother Carlos Torlades O'Neill (Lisbon, 13 December 1874 – ?), Merchant in Lisbon, where he lived single, Company Administrator, Member of the Administration Council of the Companhia de Seguros Previdente, married to Laura Moreira, without issue, and two aunts, Adelaide O'Neill (? – termo of Setúbal, her Quinta dos Bonecos, 14 November 1865), unmarried and without issue, and Ethelinda O'Neill, unmarried and without issue.

She was a great-granddaughter of José Maria O'Neill, the titular head of the Clanaboy O'Neill dynasty, whose family has been in Portugal since the 18th century, and wife Ludovina de Jesus Alves Solano.

Career

O'Neill was a writer, poet and journalist. She was also a spiritualist, member of the Superior Deliberative Council of the Federação Espírita Portuguesa and member of the Editorial Office of the magazine Espiritismo. She died on the high seas, on the Atlantic Ocean, on board of the General Osório, travelling from Brazil back to Portugal after giving one of her Spiritualist Conferences.

Marriage and issue
She married in Lisbon in 1890 António de Bulhões (c. 1870 – ?), a civil servant, and had four children:
 Maria Antónia Pereira de Eça O'Neill de Bulhões, married firstly to an English subject, divorced, without issue, and married secondly to Francisco de Sousa, without issue
 Luís Pereira de Eça O'Neill de Bulhões, married to French Madeleine Chayac, without issue
 José António Pereira de Eça O'Neill de Bulhões (Lisbon, c. 1890 – Lisbon), a bank worker, and wife Maria da Glória Vahia de Barros de Castro (17 March 1905 – aft. October 1989), daughter of Dr. Alberto de Barros e Castro, Medical Doctor (whose father declined the title of Viscount of Soares de Castro), and wife (m. 1904) Maria da Graça de Sousa Vahia (9 December 1882 – ?), and had two children:
 Maria Amélia Vahia de Castro O'Neill de Bulhões, a Nun
 Alexandre Manuel Vahia de Castro O'Neill de Bulhões (Lisbon, 19 December 1924 – Lisbon, 21 August 1986), writer and poet
 Maria Francisca Pereira de Eça O'Neill de Bulhões, unmarried and without issue

See also
 Irish nobility
 Irish kings
 Irish royal families
 O'Neill (surname)
 Uí Néill, the Irish Dynasty
 Ó Neill Dynasty Today
 O'Neill of Clannaboy

References and notes

External links
 Maria da Conceição Infante de Lacerda Pereira de Eça Custance O'Neill's Genealogy in a Portuguese Genealogical site
 

1873 births
1932 deaths
People from Lisbon
Connachta
O'Neill dynasty
Portuguese nobility
Portuguese people of British descent
Portuguese people of Irish descent
Portuguese women poets
Portuguese women writers